The 1991 Icelandic Cup was the 32nd edition of the National Football Cup.

It took place between 29 May 1991 and 27 August 1991, with the final played at Laugardalsvöllur in Reykjavik. The cup was important, as winners qualified for the UEFA Cup Winners' Cup (if a club won both the league and the cup, the defeated finalists would take their place in the Cup Winners' Cup).

The 10 clubs from the 1. Deild entered in the last 16, with clubs from lower tiers entering in the three preliminary rounds. Teams played one-legged matches. In case of a draw, a penalty shoot-out took place (there were no replays, unlike in previous years).

For the second year running, the final finished in a draw after extra time. In contrast to other rounds, a replay took place. Valur Reykjavik won their seventh Icelandic Cup, and so qualified for Europe.

Preliminary round

First round

Second round

Third round

Fourth round 

 Entry of ten teams from the 1. Deild

Quarter finals

Semi finals

Final 

 Valur Reykjavik won their seventh Icelandic Cup, and qualified for the 1992–93 European Cup Winners' Cup.

See also 

 1991 Úrvalsdeild
 Icelandic Men's Football Cup

External links 
  1991 Icelandic Cup results at the site of the Icelandic Football Federation

Icelandic Men's Football Cup
Iceland
1991 in Iceland